Jamie Victory (born 14 November 1975) is an English former footballer. He played as a defender and was last attached to Cheltenham Town, where he wore the number three shirt and usually acted as a left full back. He was born in Hackney.

Career
Early in his career he spent time at West Ham United's youth system. He signed on at Cheltenham Town on a free transfer from AFC Bournemouth in 1995.

At the start of the 2006–07 season, Victory had a testimonial game featuring the current Cheltenham Town team against a team of Cheltenham Town legends including Julian Alsop, Mike Duff, Martin Devaney, and Steve Book among others.

In May 2007, he was released by Cheltenham after eleven years with the club, and in February 2008 he retired from professional football, as the result of a recurrent pelvic injury and is currently working at the radiography department at Gloucestershire Royal Hospital.

References

External links

1975 births
Living people
English footballers
AFC Bournemouth players
Cheltenham Town F.C. players
West Ham United F.C. players
English Football League players
England semi-pro international footballers
Cheltenham Town F.C. non-playing staff
Footballers from Hackney Central
Association football defenders